Pir Zagheh (also Romanized as Pīr Zāgheh) is a village in Sain Qaleh Rural District, in the Central District of Abhar County, Zanjan Province, Iran. At the 2006 census, its population was 1,850, in 470 families.

References 

Populated places in Abhar County